Ferdinand, Graf Bubna von Littitz (26 November 1768 – 6 June 1825) was a Field marshal lieutenant (Feldmarschalleutnant) of the Imperial Austrian Army during the Napoleonic Wars and also an Austrian Privy Councillor. He held some military commands in the Kingdom of Lombardy and Venetia and led the reprisal of the Italian revolutions in 1820–21.

Notes

References
 
 

1768 births
1825 deaths
Austrian lieutenant field marshals
Austrian Empire commanders of the Napoleonic Wars
Austrian Empire military personnel of the Napoleonic Wars
Austrian soldiers
Austrian generals
Bohemian nobility
Counts of Austria